Coartaredens is an extinct genus of reptile from the Middle Triassic of England. It contains a single species, Coartaredens isaaci, from the Anisian-age Otter Sandstone of Devon. The species is based on a partial jaw and other fragments with large conical teeth. Though originally described as a lepidosauromorph, some authors have instead considered it to be a procolophonid.

References 

Middle Triassic reptiles of Europe
Triassic lepidosauromorphs
Fossil taxa described in 2002
Prehistoric reptile genera